Cromwell is a town in Middlesex County, Connecticut, United States located in the middle of the state. The population was 14,225 at the 2020 census.

The town was named after a shipping boat that traveled along the Connecticut River, which runs along Cromwell. The ship was named after Oliver Cromwell, Lord Protector of the Commonwealth of England. Other theories are that the town was named after the 1776 warship Oliver Cromwell, or named directly after the Lord Protector Cromwell.

The Roman Catholic Padre Pio Foundation of America is located in Cromwell.

The Evangelical Covenant Church's regional East Coast Conference offices are located in Cromwell.

Points of interest
 On the National Register of Historic Places:
 Main Street Historic District – roughly bounded by Nooks Hill Rd., Prospect Hill Rd., Wall and West Sts. and New Ln., and Stevens Ln. and Main St.; since October 24, 1985
 Middletown Upper Houses Historic District – on Connecticut Route 99; since July 27, 1979
 Sage-Kirby House – 93 Shunpike Road; since April 29, 1982
 TPC River Highlands – location of the Travelers Championship, PGA Tour event
 Long-time home of hardware manufacturing company Horton Brasses, Inc.
 Pierson park, Cromwell's very own park

History 
Settlers first arrived in the area that is now Cromwell in 1651 Cromwell was originally a part of Middletown known as the Upper Houses, likely due to the fact that the Mattabesset River separated it from the rest of Middletown. In 1703, Cromwell formed a separate parish from the rest of Middletown due to the inconvenience of crossing the floodplains of the Mattabesset during certain seasons. From that point on, the schools and churches of the Upper Houses (population about 250) were administered (and taxed for) separately from the rest of Middletown.

In 1850, the town began talks of splitting off into a separate town from Middletown. Possible new names included: Upper Middletown, North Middletown, Glenwood, and, the eventual choice, Cromwell, which was put forth by Senator Levi Heaton. The Connecticut General Assembly approved the incorporation on June 18, 1851.

Geography

A major north–south highway, Interstate 91, with two Cromwell exits, runs through the Town. The Central Connecticut Expressway (Route 9), opened at the end of 1989, enhances the Town's location as it connects I-95 in Old Saybrook, I-91 in Cromwell and I-84, the State's major east–west highway in New Britain.

Demographics

At the 2010 census there were 14,005 people, 5,212 households, and 3,262 families in the town. The racial makeup of the town was 93.08% White, 3.13% African American, 0.05% Native American, 1.24% Asian, 0.01% Pacific Islander, 1.03% from other races, and 1.47% from two or more races. Hispanic or Latino of any race were 3.19%.

Of the 5,212 households 28.1% had children under the age of 18 living with them, 52.0% were married couples living together, 7.8% had a female householder with no husband present, and 37.4% were non-families. 30.3% of households were one person and 11.4% were one person aged 65 or older. The average household size was 2.35 and the average family size was 2.99.

The age distribution was 21.6% under the age of 18, 5.2% from 18 to 24, 31.8% from 25 to 44, 25.3% from 45 to 64, and 16.2% 65 or older. The median age was 40 years. For every 100 females, there were 93.2 males.  For every 100 females age 18 and over, there were 91.2 males.

The median household income was US$60,662, and the median family income  was $70,505. Males had a median income of $46,223 versus $36,218 for females. The per capita income for the town was $29,786. About 1.6% of families and 3.4% of the population were below the poverty line, including 3.9% of those under age 18 and 3.4% of those age 65 or over.

Cromwell public schools

There are four public schools in Cromwell: Edna C. Stevens Elementary School (Pre-K–2), Woodside Intermediate School (3–5), Cromwell Middle School (6–8), and Cromwell High School (9–12).

Fire Protection 

Fire Protection for the Town of Cromwell is provided by the Cromwell Fire District via the Cromwell Fire Department. The Cromwell Fire Department is a combination fire department that operates out of three stations. The Fire Department operates on a rotating 24/7 schedule with six Firefighter/EMT's assigned to each shift. The Fire Department also operates ambulances to provided Emergency Medical Care to residents and visitors.

Full time Firefighters are supplemented by Part-time and Volunteer Firefighters.

Notable people

 David Gere, actor and film producer, Gere was born and raised in Cromwell and attended Cromwell High School, class of 1993
 Donald Honig, novelist, historian and editor; lived in Cromwell for over 40 years. In September 2020, there was a ceremony at the Cromwell Belden Public Library where Honig was given with a key to the town and presented with a proclamation declaring it “Donald Honig Day.” In his honor, there is a special “Donald Honig Collection,” where many of his books are on display at the library

In popular culture
 A season 6 episode of the Discovery Channel series A Haunting, called The Well from Hell, takes place in Cromwell in 2011.

References

External links

Town government website

 
Towns in Connecticut
Towns in Middlesex County, Connecticut
Connecticut populated places on the Connecticut River
Greater Hartford